The Mavericks Independent Baseball League is an adult amateur baseball league based in the Salem Metropolitan Statistical Area, Oregon, United States, founded in January 2021 and set to begin its inaugural season that May.  Each team in the Mavericks League plays a 48-game regular season schedule from May through August, with a championship series. at the conclusion of the regular season.  All the league's games are played at Volcanoes Stadium in Keizer, Oregon.

History
After the 2020-21 Minor League Baseball reorganization left the Salem-Keizer Volcanoes (hitherto members of the Northwest League as the San Francisco Giants' A Short-Season affiliate) without an affiliation, the Volcanoes resolved that they would play in 2021 nonetheless, with further information to come.  On January 26, 2021, it was announced that the Volcanoes ownership would be forming their own independent baseball league, the Mavericks League.

The league has four teams based in the Salem Metropolitan Statistical Area, with all games being played at Volcanoes Stadium in Keizer, Oregon.  It is aimed at top-level undrafted and released players, as well as high-level collegiate and former Volcanoes players seeking to rejoin the MLB affiliated minor league ranks.  To not put their collegiate players' eligibility at risk, players will not be paid for the inaugural season, but that is planned to change in the future.

In addition to the Volcanoes, the league will feature the Campesinos de Salem-Keizer (previously the Volcanoes' Copa de la Diversión alter-ego) as well as the revival of the Portland Mavericks (an infamous independent Northwest League team which played from 1973 to 1977) and the Salem Senators (a name used by numerous Northwest League teams based in Salem throughout the 20th century).

Teams

References

External links
 Official website

Baseball leagues in Oregon
Sports in Salem, Oregon
Sports leagues established in 2021
2021 establishments in Oregon